Porta Spagnola (Italian for Spanish Gate), also known as the Porta di Terra (Land Gate) is a city gate in Augusta, Sicily. It was built between 1681 and 1682 as part of the city's fortifications.

History 
The fortifications of Augusta were constructed in the 1670s and 1680s to designs of the Flemish military engineer Carlos de Grunenbergh. On 13 May 1680, the city council granted a loan of 30,000 scudi for the construction of the Porta Spagnola, which was built between 1681 and 1682. The gate is the only entrance into the historic centre of Augusta, and it was built across an isthmus which was subsequently excavated, turning the city into an island. The design of the gate is attributed to Grunenbergh himself.

The gate was located a few hundred metres away from another gate known as the Porta Madre di Dio, which no longer exists. Porta Spagnola was damaged in an earthquake on 13 December 1990, and it was restored in 2005.

Architecture 
The gate is topped by a marble coat of arms topped by a crown and supported by a lion and a griffin. Below the escutcheon there is a Latin inscription which reads:

See also 
 Porta Ligny, a similar gate in Syracuse which was demolished

References

External links

1682 establishments in the Kingdom of Sicily
Baroque architecture in Sicily
Buildings and structures completed in 1682
Buildings and structures in the Province of Syracuse
City gates
Gates in Italy